Groupers are fish of any of a number of genera in the subfamily Epinephelinae of the family Serranidae, in the order Perciformes.

Not all serranids are called "groupers"; the family also includes the sea basses. The common name "grouper" is usually given to fish in one of two large genera: Epinephelus and Mycteroperca. In addition, the species classified in the small genera Anyperidon, Cromileptes, Dermatolepis, Graciela, Saloptia, and Triso are also called "groupers." Fish in the genus Plectropomus are referred to as "coral groupers." These genera are all classified in the subfamily Epiphelinae. However, some of the hamlets (genus Alphestes), the hinds (genus Cephalopholis), the lyretails (genus Variola), and some other small genera (Gonioplectrus, Niphon, Paranthias) are also in this subfamily, and occasional species in other serranid genera have common names involving the word "grouper." Nonetheless, the word "grouper" on its own is usually taken as meaning the subfamily Epinephelinae.

Description 

Groupers are teleosts, typically having a stout body and a large mouth. They are not built for long-distance, fast swimming. They can be quite large: in length, over a meter. They swallow prey rather than biting pieces off of them. They do not have many teeth on the edges of their jaws, but they have heavy crushing tooth plates inside the pharynx. They habitually eat fish, octopuses, and crustaceans. Some species prefer to ambush their prey, while others are active predators. Reports of fatal attacks on humans by the largest species, such as the giant grouper (Epinephelus lanceolatus), are unconfirmed.

Their mouths and gills form a powerful vacuum that pulls their prey in from a distance. They also use their mouths to dig into sand to form their shelters under big rocks, jetting it out through their gills.

Research indicates roving coralgroupers (Plectropomus pessuliferus) sometimes cooperate with giant morays in hunting. Groupers are also one of the only animals that eat invasive red lionfish.

Systematics

Etymology 
The word "grouper" is from the Portuguese name, garoupa, which has been speculated to come from an indigenous South American language.

In Australia, "groper" is used instead of "grouper" for several species, such as the Queensland grouper (Epinephelus lanceolatus). In New Zealand, "groper" refers to a type of wreckfish, Polyprion oxygeneios, which goes by the Māori name hāpuku. In the Philippines, groupers are generally known as lapu-lapu in Luzon, while in the Visayas and Mindanao they are known as pugapo. Its Indonesian name is kerapu. In the Middle East, the fish is known as 'hammour', and is widely eaten, especially in the Persian Gulf region. In Latin America, the fish is known as 'mero'.

The species in the tribes Grammistini and Diploprionini secrete a mucus-like toxin in their skin called grammistin, and when they are confined in a restricted space and subjected to stress, the mucus produces a foam that is toxic to nearby fish.  These fishes are often called soapfishes. They have been classified either as their own families or within subfamilies, although they are classified by the 5th Edition of the Fishes of the World, classifies these two groups as tribes within the subfamily Epinephelinae.

Classification
According to the 5th edition of Fishes of the World, the subfamily is divided up into 5 tribes containing a total of 32 genera and 234 species.

Subfamily Epinephelinae Bleeker, 1874 (groupers)
Tribe Niphonini D.S. Jordan, 1923
 Niphon Cuvier, 1828
Tribe Epinephelini Bleeker, 1874
 Aethaloperca Fowler, 1904
 Alphestes Bloch & Schneider, 1801
 Anyperodon Günther, 1859
 Cephalopholis Bloch & Schneider, 1801
 Chromileptes Swainson, 1839
 Dermatolepis Gill, 1861
 Epinephelus Bloch, 1793
 Gonioplectrus Gill, 1862
 Gracila Randall, 1964
 Hyporthodus Gill, 1861
 Mycteroperca Gill, 1862
 Paranthias Guichenot, 1868
 Plectropomus Pken, 1817
 Saloptia J.L.B. Smith, 1964
 Triso Randall, Johnson & Lowe, 1989
 Variola Swainson, 1839
Tribe Diploprionini Bleeker, 1874
 Aulacocephalus Temminck & Schlegel, 1843
 Belonoperca Fowler & B.A. Bean, 1930
 Diploprion Cuvier, 1828
 Tribe Liopropomini Poey, 1867
 Bathyanthias Günther, 1880
 Liopropoma Gill, 1861
 Rainfordia McCulloch, 1923
Tribe Grammistini Bleeker, 1857
 Aporops Schultz, 1943
 Grammistes Bloch & Schneider, 1801
 Grammistops Schultz 1953
 Jeboehlkia Robins, 1967
 Pogonoperca Günther 1859
 Pseudogramma Bleeker, 1875
 Rypticus Cuvier, 1829
 Suttonia J.L.B. Smith, 1953

Reproduction 
Groupers are mostly monandric protogynous hermaphrodites, i.e., they mature only as females and can change sex after sexual maturity. Some species of groupers grow about a kilogram per year and are generally adolescents until they reach three kilograms when they become female. The largest males often control harems containing three to 15 females. Groupers often pair spawn, which enables large males to competitively exclude smaller males from reproducing. As such, if a small female grouper were to change sex before it could control a harem as a male, its fitness would decrease. If no male is available, the largest female that can increase fitness by changing sex will do so.

However, some groupers are gonochoristic. Gonochorism, or a reproductive strategy with two distinct sexes, has evolved independently in groupers at least five times. The evolution of gonochorism is linked to group spawning high amounts of habitat cover. Both group spawning and habitat cover increase the likelihood of a smaller male reproducing in the presence of large males. The fitness of male groupers in environments where competitive exclusion of smaller males is impossible is correlated with sperm production and thus testicle size. Gonochoristic groupers have larger testes than protogynous groupers (10% of body mass compared to 1% of body mass), indicating the evolution of gonochorism increased male grouper fitness in environments where large males were unable to competitively exclude small males from reproducing.

Parasites 

Like other fish, groupers harbor parasites, including digeneans, nematodes, cestodes, monogeneans, isopods, and copepods. A study conducted in New Caledonia has shown that coral reef-associated groupers have about ten species of parasites per fish species. Species of Pseudorhabdosynochus, monogeneans of the family Diplectanidae are typical of and especially numerous on groupers.

Modern use 

Many groupers are important food fish; some are now farmed. Unlike most other fish species, which are chilled or frozen, groupers are usually sold alive in markets. Many species are popular game fish for sea-angling. Some species are small enough to be kept in aquaria, though even the small species are inclined to grow rapidly. 

Groupers are commonly reported as a source of Ciguatera fish poisoning. DNA barcoding of grouper species might help control Ciguatera fish poisoning since fish are easily identified, even from meal remnants, with molecular tools.

Size 
Malaysian newspaper The Star reported a  grouper being caught off the waters near Pulau Sembilan in the Strait of Malacca in January 2008. Shenzhen News in China reported that a  grouper swallowed a  whitetip reef shark at the Fuzhou Sea World aquarium.

In September 2010, a Costa Rican newspaper reported a  grouper in Cieneguita, Limón. In November 2013, a  grouper had been caught and sold to a hotel in Dongyuan, China.

In August 2014, off Bonita Springs in Florida (USA), a big grouper took in one gulp a 4-foot shark that an angler had caught.

See also 
 Dusky grouper

References

External links 

ARKive – images and movies of the humpback grouper (Chromileptes altivelis)

Epinephelinae
Serranidae
Hawaiian cuisine
Commercial fish
Fish common names
Cuisine of the Southern United States